Jauravia opaca, is a species of lady beetle native to India, and Sri Lanka.

Description
Body sub-hemispherical. Dorsum light brown whereas the external border of elytra is much lighter. Ventrum comparatively bright yellowish brown in color excepting darker metasternum.

References 

Coccinellidae
Insects of Sri Lanka
Beetles described in 1900